Queens of Noize were a DJ duo based in London, consisting of Mairead Nash and Tabitha Denholm. During their time as a duo they presented for MTV2 and BBC 6 Music and performed at a number of international festivals.

Career
Their career began in 2002 with their club night at Club 333 in Shoreditch, which subsequently moved to the Camden Barfly. They performed internationally at clubs and festivals including the Carling Weekend, Roskilde Festival and Festival Internacional de Benicàssim, and presented their own show on MTV2. They also released a single, "Indie Boys (Don't Deserve It)", to little critical or commercial success.

They started presenting a radio show in September 2006 on BBC 6 Music, called Queens of Noize Sonic Safari. The show was first broadcast from 12am–2am Saturday into Sunday, then from 7 April 2007 it moved to a Saturday afternoon time slot of 4pm–6pm, until 31 May 2008 when the slot was taken over by Lauren Laverne. The pair hosted a two-hour show on BBC 6 Music 12am–2am Friday into Saturday from June 2008 until April 2009. As well their own show they also presented the Listener 6 Mix on Sunday nights 8pm–10pm from November 2007 until September 2008, then took over the 6 Mix for a period.

Since leaving BBC radio, Denholm has been working as a video director, while Nash runs a own record label, Luv.

References

External links
BBC 6 Music Queens of Noize radio programme website

English dance music groups
Musical groups established in 2002
2002 establishments in England
English musical duos